New Congo Square is the third studio album released by the New Orleans-based Afro-Cuban jazz group Los Hombres Calientes, co-led by trumpeter Irvin Mayfield and Bill Summers. This marks the band's first album without drummer Jason Marsalis.

Track listing 
"Forforo Fo Firi" 4:55
"Intro"   :06
"Brother Runnin' (Mark's Groove, Pt. 1)" 4:47
"Brother Getin' Caught (Mark's Groove, Pt. 2)" 3:23
"Fantizias de Samba" 3:59
"New Second Line (Mardi Gras 2001)" 7:19
"Jah Rastafarai" 3:13
"New Bus Stop" 5:24
"El Negro, Pt. 1" :32
"El Negro, Pt. 2" 3:33
"El Negro, Pt. 3" 3:05
"Dominicanos" :36
"Corcovado/Nocturnal Low Moan" 3:32
"Africa N.O. (Ed's Groove)" 3:13
"Sentimientos" 7:51
"Nyabingi" 1:13
"I Shot the Sheriff" 3:56
"Bandera" 2:39
"Digidall" 4:38
"Warrior Suite, Pt. 1" 2:10
"Warrior Suite, Pt. 2" 2:19
"Warrior Suite, Pt. 3" 1:10
"Call It What You Want" 4:58

Personnel
Irvin Mayfield - trumpeter, bandleader
Bill Summers - percussionist, bandleader
Edwin Livingston - double bass
Ronald Markham and Victor Atkins III - piano
Horacio "El Negro" Hernandez - drummer

References

2001 albums
Los Hombres Calientes albums